Planchon may refer to:
 Jules Émile Planchon (1823–1888), a French botanist
 Roger Planchon (1931–2009), a French playwright and director
 Rubén Planchón (born 1982), a Uruguayan football player

See also 
 Planchón-Peteroa, a complex volcano extending in a north–south direction along the border between Argentina and Chile